Seeley Union School District is a public school district in Imperial County, California, United States.

References

External links
 

School districts in Imperial County, California
1912 establishments in California
School districts established in 1912